Cinajara or Sinaqara is a mountain in the Vilcanota mountain range in the Andes of Peru, about  high. It is situated in the Cusco Region, Quispicanchi Province, in the districts Ccarhuayo and  Ocongate. Cinajara lies southwest of the Jolljepunco. The annual religious Quyllur Rit'i festival takes place at the foot of the mountains Cinajara and Jolljepunco.

References

Mountains of Peru
Mountains of Cusco Region